Expedition 6 was the sixth expedition to the International Space Station (25 November 2002 - 3 May 2003). It was the last three-man crew to reside on the station until the arrival of STS-121. The crew performed two spacewalks in support of maintenance and assembly of the International Space Station.

Crew

Mission parameters 
 Perigee: 384 km
 Apogee: 396 km
 Inclination: 51.6°
 Period: 92 min

Mission objectives 
The Station's sixth crew was launched to the Station aboard Space Shuttle Endeavour STS-113 in November 2002. The mission was planned to be a four-month mission that was to end in March 2003 when Atlantis STS-114 was to fly to the Station with the Expedition 7 crew. The Columbia disaster, which occurred during the mission on 1 February 2003 and resulted in the indefinite suspension of Shuttle flights, led to a change of plan such that the crew stayed on the station until May 2003. They returned to Earth on Soyuz TMA-1, and a reduced Expedition 7 crew with just two members was delivered to the ISS on Soyuz TMA-2. The Space Shuttle was expected to be grounded for up to two years. Ongoing logistical support for the ISS would have to be carried out by Soyuz and Progress flights until the Space Shuttle returned to flight.

The sixth crew of the International Space Station returned to Earth just after 10 p.m. EDT on 3 May 2003, the first time U.S. astronauts landed in a Russian Soyuz spacecraft, though a U.S. space tourist, Dennis Tito, had done so in 2001.

Russian Mission Control reported at approximately 2:45 a.m. on 4 May that the support helicopters had reached the crew and all three astronauts were in good health. The capsule touched down approximately 276 miles (444 km) from its planned landing zone.

Originally scheduled to fly on the Expedition 6 Crew in place of Don Pettit was Donald A. Thomas.

Spacewalks 
The Expedition Six crew conducted two spacewalks during its stay at the International Space Station. Both were based out of the Quest Airlock, and the spacewalkers used U.S. spacesuits, which are called Extravehicular Mobility Units, or EMUs. The crew was originally scheduled to conduct only one spacewalk, but a second was added to the manifest for 8 April in order to prepare for future assembly missions.

The two Expedition Six extravehicular activities bring the total number of spacewalks conducted in support of ISS assembly and maintenance to 51. Of those 51 EVA's, Twenty-six have been based out of the station, with 17 staged from Quest. Bowersox and Pettit accumulated 13 hours and 17 minutes of spacewalking time at the station.

Cultural references 
Expedition 6 is the subject of the book Too Far From Home: A Story of Life and Death in Space, by Chris Jones.

A dramatised account of Expedition 6 is told in Expedition 6, a play by actor/playwright Bill Pullman.  The play was scheduled to run at San Francisco's Magic Theater through 7 October 2007.

References

External links

 Expedition 6 Photography

Expedition 06
2002 in spaceflight
2003 in spaceflight